Mohamed Amir Bourahli (born February 3, 1981 in Constantine) is an Algerian football player who plays for WA Tlemcen in the Algerian Ligue Professionnelle 1.

Club career
On August 16, 2011, Bourahli signed a two year contract with ASO Chlef.

Honours
 Finalist of the Algerian Cup once with CA Batna in 2010

References

External links
 DZFoot Profile
 

1981 births
Living people
Footballers from Constantine, Algeria
Algerian footballers
Algerian Ligue Professionnelle 1 players
Algerian Ligue 2 players
ASO Chlef players
AS Khroub players
CA Batna players
MO Constantine players
US Biskra players
WA Tlemcen players
Association football forwards
21st-century Algerian people